Kaitiakitanga is a New Zealand Māori term used for the concept of guardianship, for the sky, the sea, and the land. A kaitiaki is a guardian, and the process and practices of protecting and looking after the environment are referred to as kaitiakitanga.

The concept and terminology have been increasingly brought into public policy on trusteeship or guardianship—in particular with the environmental and resource controls under the Resource Management Act.

Kaitiakitanga
The long-established Māori system of environmental management is holistic.  It is a system that ensures peace within the environment, providing a process of, as well as preventing intrusions that cause permanent imbalances and guards against environmental damage. Kaitiakitanga is a concept that has "roots deeply embedded in the complex code of tikanga”. Kaitiakitanga is a broad notion which includes the following ideas: guardianship, care, wise management. However, while kaitiakitanga is a proactive and preventative approach to environmental management, this traditional management system has not always had an opportunity to address large scale environmental degradation.

Concept
Traditionally all Māori trace their ancestry to the beginning of existence, the single entity that became Ranginui and Papatūānuku. Ranginui became the sky and Papatūānuku the mother earth, with their children taking the form of the various physical elements that humans eventually emerged from. This genealogy is a bond between humans and the rest of the physical world both "immutable and inseparable". Papatūānuku, embodied in the physical form of the earth continues to provide sustenance for all. Accordingly, Māori read more into the interpretation of kaitiakitanga than just the surface meaning of the words translated into English.

Legislation
A number of government act provides for recognition of Treaty of Waitangi and kaitiakitanga, including the Conservation Act 1987, though perhaps most importantly is the Resource Management Act 1991 (RMA) and its amendments. Under Section 7 of the RMA all individuals exercising functions and powers in relation to managing the use, development and protection of natural and physical resources are required to “have particular regard” to kaitiakitanga amongst others. 
Through the RMA the concept of kaitiakitanga has been given a statutory definition. This definition of kaitiakitanga was given within the RMA in section 2(1) as “the exercise of guardianship; and in relation to a resource, includes the ethic of stewardship based on the nature of the resource itself”. However, opposition to this definition and interpretation  resulted in this being amended in the Resource Management Amendment Act 1997 to “the exercise of guardianship by the tāngata whenua of an area in accordance with tikanga Māori in relation to natural and physical resources; and includes the ethics of stewardship”. Despite this definition in RMA, it is the Papatipu Rūnanga holding manawhenua tribal authority over a particular area or resource that will be able to determine the characteristics of kaitiakitanga and how this will be expressed. In addition to the RMA, the New Zealand Fisheries Act 1996, Part 9, provides for customary fisheries management, without directly identifying this management as kaitiakitanga.

Further, there is the role of Tangata Tiaki who are chosen by iwi and hapū groups and appointed by the Ministry of Fisheries to act as guardians for a specific area. Tangata Tiaki are responsible for issuing permits to catch fish in their area for customary use and must report these catches to the Ministry of Fisheries so that the following year’s catch limits can be set allowing for customary use beyond the recreational fishing bag-limits. Tangata Tiaki/Kaitiaki may decide to develop management plans for the fisheries within their rōhe for approval by the local tāngata whenua. For the purposes of the RMA these plans are called "Iwi Planning Documents", there being requirement for these plans to be considered in any resource management planning. Under the Fisheries Act, plans can also be used for the development of sustainability measures for those fisheries in the rōhe of the tāngata whenua. Moreover, a kaitiaki has a dual responsibility: firstly, the aim of protecting the mauri; and secondly, the duty to pass the environment to future generations in a state which is as good as, or better than, the current state.

Coastal resource management

Under the RMA all those exercising power have a mandatory obligation to recognise and make provision for Māori cultural values in all aspects of resource management when preparing and administering regional and district plans, this includes the mandated Coastal Policy Statement. There is a requirement within the RMA for at least one New Zealand coastal policy statement to be in effect at all times. Thus, with consideration of kaitiakitanga in New Zealand legislation, the practical significance of kaitiakitanga in coastal resource management can be explored. In particular, Policy 2 of the 2010 New Zealand Coastal Policy Statement

This calls for coastal managers to take into account a number of aspects regarding tāngata whenua concerns regarding the coastal environment. This includes providing tāngata whenua opportunities to exercise kaitiakitanga “over waters, forests, lands, and fisheries in the coastal environment”. This includes among others to provide opportunities for Māori involvement in decision making, such as to “take into account any relevant iwi resource management plan and any other relevant planning document recognised by the appropriate iwi authority or hapū”. Any iwi resource management plan needs to be lodged with a relevant regional or district council. Further, councils are also required to consider practical assistance to those iwi or hapū who have indicated a wish to develop iwi resource management plans.

Tools

Taiāpure-local fisheries
A taiāpure identifies an area that, as a source of food or for spiritual or cultural reasons, has customarily been of special significance to an iwi or hapū. The purpose of acknowledging a taiāpure is to provide improved provision for recognising rangatiratanga and the fisheries rights secured under the Article 2 of the Treaty of Waitangi. A management committee for a taiāpure is appointed by the Minister of Fisheries with the members of the committee being nominated by the tāngata whenua.  The taiāpure management committee has the role of recommending regulations that allow a taiāpure to be managed for the conservation and management of the fish, aquatic life, or seaweed in the taiāpure-local fishery and to allow the taiāpure function according to custom.

Regulations may be related to the following: a. the species of fish, aquatic life or seaweed that may be taken, b. the quantity of each species that may be taken, c. the dates or seasons that each species may be taken, the size limits relating to each species that may be taken, d. the method by which each species may be taken and e. the area or areas in which each species may be taken.

Mātaitai
Mātaitai are reserves where the tāngata whenua manage all non-commercial fishing by making bylaws, which apply equally to all individuals having been approved by the Minister of Fisheries. Such reserves identify places of importance for customary food gathering  and these reserves can only be applied for over traditional fishing grounds, and must be areas of special significance to the tāngata whenua. Commercial fishing is prohibited within these reserves. Tāngata whenua appoint tānagata tiaki to manage mātaitai, which a tāngata tiaki does by creating the bylaws.

Rāhui

A rāhui is a temporary closure. A temporary closure is allowed for under Section 186 of the Fisheries Act 1996 and provides for fishing to cease or be restricted in New Zealand waters of the South Island as part of the Ngāi Tahu Claims Settlement Act 1998. The purpose of a rāhui is to improve the size and/or availability of fish stocks, or to recognise their use and management by tāngata whenua. However, under Section 186b of the Fisheries Act 1996 a temporary closure may not be in force beyond 2 years after the date of its notification, but the rāhui may be extended beyond the two-year period.  A rahui can be applied for and emplaced for any particular seasons, months, weeks, days or dates.

Case studies

Kaikōura

Introduction
Kaikōura is a small coastal community on the east coast of the South Island of New Zealand with a long history of coastal resource use and remains an important component of the identity of the local tāngata whenua. Manawhenua (tribal authority) over this area is held by Ngāti Kuri, one of 18 Ngāi Tahu papatipu rūnanga, and have had increased opportunities to develop a local community management strategy, incorporating socio-cultural values along with those of the biophysical. This has been done in cooperation with government, fisheries stakeholders and community agencies. There are a number of issues on tāngata whenua values including water quality issues impacting on kai moana being faced by this Rūnanga that stem from tourism, fishing and other resource uses.

Progress in Kaitiakitanga

Environmental management Plan
In order to provide a framework for the Rūnanga to effectively apply tangata whenua values and policies to natural resource and environmental management in the areaTe Rūnanga o Kaikōura developed Te Poha o Toha Raumati: Te Runanga o Kaikoura Environmental Management Plan (Te Poha).  The plan took effect  from 2005. Te Poha provides a written statement that consolidates Ngāti Kuri values, knowledge and perspectives on natural resource and environmental management issues, including the coastal marine area and is an expression of kaitiakitanga.  
The plan has a number of stated purposes: to describe the values underpinning the relationship between Ngāti Kuri and the natural environment, to identify the primary issues associated with natural resource and environmental management within the takiwā, articulate Te Rūnanga o Kaikōura policies and management guidelines for natural resource and environmental management, including the coastal environment, and to provide continuity between the past, the present  and the future. All these purposes are intended to be viewed and be consistent with Ngāti Kuri values. 
Further, the stated purpose of this plan is to provide a tool for Te Rūnanga o Kaikōura to not only effectively and proactively apply Ngāti Kuri values to the management of natural resources, wāhi tapu and wāhi taonga, but also to give assistance to local, territorial and national authorities to understand Ngāti Kuri values and perspectives, and fulfil their statutory obligations under the Resource Management Act 1991, Conservation Act 1987 and other environmental legislation.

Kaikoura Marine Strategy
In addition to the Environmental Management Plan there is the Kaikōura Marine Strategy developed by Te Korowai o Te Tai ō Marokura (Kaikōura Coastal Marine Guardians) and is currently in proposal form. Te Korowai membership is not only that of Te Rūnanga o Kaikōura, but also local organisations involved at differing levels of responsibility such as Te Rūnanga o Ngāi Tahu and Kaikōura District Council and various concerned government ministries and interest groups.  It is this inclusion of local, regional and national organisations that strengthens the opportunities for Ngāti Kuri values and kaitiakitanga principles to be supported in any proposed implementations in the frequently socially and politically contentious coastal environment.  
Based from local knowledge and best available science the Kaikoura Marine Strategy has a vision formed around four outcomes and four “cross cutting implementation actions”. These outcomes are fishing for abundance, protecting local treasures, living sustainably and sustaining customary practices with the implementation actions being engaging understanding, governance, compliance and monitoring and review.

Issues and action
For the tāngata whenua of this coastal area there has been concern over the prevalence of black market and poaching of fish and other seafood in the Kaikōura area.  Further, with no fisheries officer based in Kaikōura it is the local community that have been mostly required to monitor the fishing in the area. Due to the pressures from the combination of recreational, commercial and customary harvesters depleting fish stocks a section 186b temporary closure as a form of rāhui was proposed and emplaced on the  Waiōpuka reef area of the Kaikōura Peninsula, see figure 2. This rahui has been renewed three times and has been very successful.

Wider modern use of the term
The term kaitiaki is increasingly used in New Zealand for broader roles of trusteeship or guardianship—especially in public sector organisations, as these examples demonstrate:

 A proposed "Governance-Kaitiaki group" to oversee electronic authentication by government
 New Zealand's Chief Ombudsman is "Nga Kaitiaki Mana Tangata" in Māori (i.e. "The guardian of the people")
 The role of kaitiaki in the management of the Koha software project
 Those who oppose the planned housing development at Ihumātao refer to themselves as kaitiaki, and set up a camp on the site in 2016 which became known as Kaitiaki Village.

See also
 Coastal Management
 Hima (environmental protection)
 Māori influence on New Zealand English
 Māori language
 Māori religion
 Stewardship (theology)
 Traditional Ecological Knowledge

References

Further reading
 Climate Survivor - fighting climate change in the Pacific

External links
 Kaitiakitanga – guardianship and conservation in Te Ara - the Encyclopedia of New Zealand

Māori religion
Māori words and phrases
Māori culture
Māori science
Environmentalism and religion
Indigenous peoples and the environment